Tournament was part of the Association of Tennis Professionals (ATP) Challenger Tour. It took place annually in Košice, Slovakia from 2003 to 2014 and then was moved to Poprad.

Past finals

Singles

Doubles

External links

ITF search

 
ATP Challenger Tour
Clay court tennis tournaments
Tennis tournaments in Slovakia
Recurring sporting events established in 2003
Recurring sporting events disestablished in 2014
2003 establishments in Slovakia
2014 disestablishments in Slovakia